Carnival Queen, or sometimes Carnaval Queen is the name or title given to a woman or a girl who is chosen to perform official duties during the celebration of the Carnival, a festive season which occurs immediately before Lent wherein the main events are usually held annually in February. The title is also given to a woman or a girl who has won the beauty and talent competition during the Carnival, or a woman who won a beauty and talent contest and thus become the representative during the celebration of the Carnival.

One notable place in Spain that elects a new Carnival Queen every year is Santa Cruz de Tenerife. On the other hand, the Carnival in Tarragona — also in Spain — starts with the building of a huge barrel and the later ends with the burning of that barrel together with the burning of the effigies of the Carnival Queen and the Carnival King, a symbolic ritual that signifies bidding "farewell to the flesh" (literally "to remove meat") by men and women — such as from their diet — before the Lenten season, a form of human renewal, because meat or the "flesh" is prohibited during Lent.

See also
Rex parade
King of the Carnival
Homecoming Queen

References

External links

Carnivals
Carnivals in Spain
Beauty pageants by type
Brazilian Carnival
Carnival in the United States
Queens